Tonga Tuʻiʻafitu, styled Lord Tuʻiʻafitu (born October 3, 1962) is a Tongan noble, clergyman, politician and Cabinet Minister.

Tuʻiʻafitu has a BDiv degree from Siaʻatoutai Theological College and two MA degrees, in Political Science and in Public Policy, both from the Australian National University.

Tuʻiʻafitu began his career in national politics when he was elected to Parliament as Noble's Representative for Vavaʻu in the November 2010 general election. He was appointed Deputy Speaker in the Legislative Assembly. On 5 July 2012, he was appointed Minister for Health in Prime Minister Lord Tuʻivakano's Cabinet, following ‘Uliti Uata's resignation to join the Opposition.

On 28 December 2021 he was appointed to the Cabinet of Siaosi Sovaleni as Minister for Lands and Natural Resources. He was the only noble appointed to Sovaleni's Cabinet.

Honours
National honours
  Order of Queen Sālote Tupou III, Commander (31 July 2008).

References

1962 births
Members of the Legislative Assembly of Tonga
Tongan nobles
Living people
Tongan Christian clergy
Australian National University alumni
People from Vavaʻu
Ministers of Health of Tonga
Government ministers of Tonga